Ben George Liddle (born 21 September 1998) is an English professional footballer who plays as a central midfielder for  club Darlington. He previous played in the Football League for Middlesbrough, Forest Green Rovers, Scunthorpe United and Bristol Rovers, in the Scottish Championship for Queen of the South, and in non-league football for Blyth Spartans.

Personal life
Liddle was born in 1998 in Durham. He is the son of former Middlesbrough and Darlington centre-back Craig Liddle.

Club career

Middlesbrough
Liddle signed his first professional contract with Middlesbrough in the summer of 2016. Liddle appeared in the EFL Trophy for the Middlesbrough U23 side in both the 2017–18 and the 2018–19 competitions, featuring in all three group matches in each. He made his Championship debut for Middlesbrough on 30 November 2019, replacing Lewis Wing in the 70th minute of a 4–0 defeat at Leeds United. He made his first start for the club on 14 January 2020, playing 57 minutes of a 2–1 defeat away at Tottenham Hotspur in the FA Cup. This proved to be his last game for the club.

Blyth Spartans (loan)
On 22 March 2018, he joined National League North side Blyth Spartans on loan until the end of the season.

Forest Green Rovers (loan)
Liddle joined League Two club Forest Green Rovers on 31 January 2019 on loan until the end of the season. He made his debut on 12 February 2019, coming on as a substitute for Lloyd James in a 2–0 loss to Swindon Town at the County Ground.

Scunthorpe United (loan)
On 31 January 2020, Liddle joined another League Two club, Scunthorpe United, on loan until the end of the season. The following day he made his debut in the starting eleven away to Crawley Town, but was replaced at half-time with the score 3–0 to the hosts; the match ended 3–1. Liddle made another three appearances before the season was ended early due to the coronavirus pandemic.

Bristol Rovers
On 8 October 2020, Liddle joined Bristol Rovers for an undisclosed fee, signing a two-year deal. He made his debut on 7 November, coming on in the 73rd minute of a 2–1 FA Cup victory over Walsall. On 6 February 2021, Liddle made his league debut, and fourth appearance in all competitions, as he started before being replaced in the 65th minute of a 0–0 draw with Fleetwood Town.

He made one appearance in the 2021–22 EFL Cup before joining Scottish Championship club Queen of the South on a season-long loan. He made 19 appearances in all competitions, and scored his first senior goal, opening the scoring in a 3–3 draw away to Raith Rovers, before returning to Bristol Rovers, who released him when his contract expired at the end of the 2021–22 season.

Darlington
Having been without a club since leaving Bristol Rovers, Liddle signed for National League club Darlington on 18 August 2022.

Career statistics

References

1998 births
Living people
Footballers from County Durham
English footballers
Association football midfielders
Middlesbrough F.C. players
Blyth Spartans A.F.C. players
Forest Green Rovers F.C. players
Scunthorpe United F.C. players
Bristol Rovers F.C. players
Queen of the South F.C. players
Darlington F.C. players
National League (English football) players
English Football League players
Scottish Professional Football League players